Daniel M. Fox (June 16, 1819 – March 20, 1890) was the Mayor of Philadelphia from 1869 to 1872.

Life
Fox was born in Philadelphia, Pennsylvania to John and Margaret Fox and was reared in the former Northern Liberties Township. Upon completing school, he worked as a salesman before studying conveyancing, working under a practitioner for five years before going into business for himself. At twenty-one, he was elected a school director in Northern Liberties, including service as president of the board, and also represented the district in the board of health and was elected a director of Girard College by the Philadelphia City Council. He represented Philadelphia's 12th Ward in the Select Council for three years until 1861.

Fox ran unsuccessfully for mayor as the nominee of the Democratic Party in 1862 and 1865, losing to Republicans Alexander Henry and Morton McMichael, respectively. He won the mayoral election of 1868 against Hector Tyndale by a close margin, a matter that was resolved by the courts after the results were contested. During his tenure, improvements were made to sanitary conditions in the city and the Philadelphia Fire Department was established, a move that proved controversial with the displaced volunteer fire houses, a number of which displayed effigies of the mayor.

After his term as mayor, Fox served as president of the Philadelphia Conveyancers' Association. He died on March 20, 1890 in Atlantic City, New Jersey.

References

External links

1809 births
1890 deaths
19th-century American politicians
Mayors of Philadelphia
Pennsylvania Democrats
Philadelphia City Council members
School board members in Pennsylvania